Gašpar Perušić (died 1507) was a Croatian nobleman, who was one of the founders of Perušić, along with his brother Dominik. Gašpar and his brother came from a Croatian noble family. In 1487, along with his brother, they founded Perušić, which got its name from their last name. He was a gubernatorial governor. He is known for signing the Peace of Pressburg which guaranteed the right of succession to the Croatian throne to the House of Habsburg.

References

Year of birth missing
15th-century Croatian nobility
16th-century Croatian nobility
1507 deaths
History of Lika